Elisa Brune (15 July 1966 – 29 November 2018) was a Belgian writer and journalist.  She held a doctorate in environmental science.

Works
 Fissures. Paris : L’Harmattan, 1996 (lauréat du prix de la Première Œuvre et du prix Maeterlinck) ; Ancrage, 2000
 Petite révision du ciel. Paris : Ramsay, 1999 (récompensé par le prix Emma du Cayla-Martin et le Grand Prix France/Wallonie Bruxelles) ; J'ai lu 2000
 Blanche Cassé. Paris : Ramsay, 2000 (prix de la rédaction du magazine Gaël)
 La Tournante. Paris : Ramsay 2001 ; J'ai Lu, 2003
 Les Jupiter chauds. Paris: Belfond 2002 ; Labor, 2006
 La Tentation d'Edouard. Paris : Belfond, 2003
 Le goût piquant de l'univers : Récit de voyage en apesanteur. Paris : Le Pommier, 2004
 Relations d'incertitude (avec Edgard Gunzig). Paris : Ramsay, 2004 (Prix Victor-Rossel des jeunes) ; Labor 2006
 Un homme est une rose. Paris : Ramsay, 2005
 De la transe à l'hypnose: récit de voyage en terrain glissant. Éditions Bernard Gilson, 2006
 Le Quark, le neurone et le psychanalyste. Paris : Le Pommier, 2006
 Séismes et volcans - Qu'est-ce qui fait palpiter la Terre?, (avec Monica Rotaru). Paris, Le Pommier, 2007
 Alors heureuse... croient-ils! La vie sexuelle des femmes normales. Paris : Le Rocher, 2008
 Bonnes nouvelles des étoiles, avec Jean-Pierre Luminet, Paris, Odile Jacob, 2009
Prix Manlev-Bendall de l'Académie Nationale des sciences, belles-lettres et arts de Bordeaux

 Le secret des femmes, Voyage au coeur du plaisir et de la jouissance, avec Yves Ferroul, Paris, Odile Jacob, 2010
 La mort dans l'âme - Tango avec Cioran, Paris, Odile Jacob, 2011
Prix de la Société des Gens de Lettres

 La révolution du plaisir féminin - Sexualité et orgasme, Paris, Odile Jacob, 2012

References

1966 births
2018 deaths
Belgian women journalists
Belgian women writers
Belgian writers in French
Belgian environmentalists